Rudolf "Rudi" Köppen (born 5 February 1943) is a German athlete. He competed in the men's high jump at the 1964 Summer Olympics.

References

1943 births
Living people
People from Rathenow
People from the Province of Brandenburg
German male high jumpers
Sportspeople from Brandenburg
Olympic athletes of the United Team of Germany
Athletes (track and field) at the 1964 Summer Olympics